On the Run is a 1982 Australian thriller film.

Plot
A small boy (Beau Cox) is orphaned and sent to live with his uncle (Rod Taylor), who is a hitman. When the boy witnesses his uncle kill some people, his uncle orders that his assistant (Paul Winfield) help shoot the boy; the assistant refuses and takes off with the boy.

Production
The movie marked the first time Rod Taylor had played an Australian character in an Australian film.

Release
The film was not released theatrically, although it did have one theatrical screening in Bondi NSW, a condition of the movie's financing via tax concession.

References

External links

On the Run at National Film and Sound Archive
On the Run at Ozmovies.

Australian thriller films
1980s English-language films
1980s Australian films